Albert Bertrand Hemmerdinger (1 October 1921 – 19 January 2017) was a French historian who specialised in ancient history.

Bibliography 
1955: Essai sur l'histoire du texte de Thucydide, Paris, Les Belles Lettres,
1963: Les livres ternaires des Alexandrins, Brussels, 
1964: La culture grecque classique du VIIème au IXème siècle, Brussels, 
1965: La prétendue manus Philodemi, Paris, 
1965: Le "Codex" 252 de la Bibliothèque de Photius, 
1965: Note sur deux fragments grecs de Saint Irénée,
1965: Nadar et Jules Verne, 
1965: Contre les hérésies : édition critique d'après les versions arménienne et latine - Irénée de Lyon, Paris, Ed. du Cerf,
1966: Le Parisinus de Lucrèce, Wiesbaden, F. Steiner, 
1966: Les Lettres latines à Constantinople jusqu'à Justinien, Amsterdam, A. M. Hakkert, 
1966: Observations critiques sur Irénée, IV (Sources chrétiennes 100) ou les mésaventures d'un philologue, Oxford, Clarendon press,
1967: Le "De plantis" de Nicolas de Damas à Planude, Berlin,
1970: De la Méconnaissance de quelques étymologies grecques, Göttingen, Vanden-Hoeck und Ruprecht, 
1970: Comptes de chasseurs d'éléphants, Leipzig, Teubner,
1981: Les Manuscrits d'Hérodote et la critique verbale, Genova, Istituto di filologia classica e medievale,
1982: Que les habitants de Byblos portèrent en Grèce le papyrus égyptien et l'écriture phénicienne,
1982: Réflexions sur les divers génies du peuple romain, de Charles de Saint-Evremond, Naples, Jovene,
1984: Pseudo-Xénophon, Roma, Accademia nazionale dei Lincei,
1984: Précis des guerres de César écrit par Marchand à l'île Sainte-Hélène sous la dictée de l'Empereur Napoléon, Naples, Jovene,
1986: Commentaire de l'"Économie politique des Romains" et de la "Climatologie comparée de l'Italie et de l'Andalousie anciennes et modernes",
1992: Montesquieu et Frédéric le grand, Torino, Rosemberg e Sellier,

References

External links 
 Bertrand Hemminger on data.bnf.fr
 Hemmerdinger, Bertrand (1921-....) on IdRef
 Essai sur l'histoire du texte de Thucydide
 Recherches sur le texte de Thucydide

1921 births
2017 deaths
20th-century French historians
French hellenists
French historiographers
French Latinists